Karuna Dutta is an Asom Gana Parishad politician from Assam. He was elected in Assam Legislative Assembly election in 1996 from Majuli constituency.

References 

Year of birth missing
Possibly living people
Asom Gana Parishad politicians
Assam MLAs 1996–2001
People from Majuli district